Vizeleutnant, short Vzlt (en: Vice lieutenant), is a rank of the higher non-commissioned officers NCO rank group (also rank group: Stabsunteroffiziere) in the Austrian Bundesheer. The rank was introduced first from 1924 to 1938 and reused from 1956 onwards. It is the highest Stabsunteroffizier rank. 
It is grouped as OR9 in NATO, equivalent to a Sergeant Major in the United States Army / Chief Master Sergeant (United States Air Force),  and a Warrant Officer Class 1 in the British Army / Warrant officer (Royal Air Force).

In army / air force context NCOs of this rank were formally addressed as Herr/ Frau Vizeleutnant also informally / short Vize.

See also
 Ranks of the Austrian Bundesheer

References 

Military ranks of Austria